Events from the year 1860 in Canada.

Incumbents
Monarch — Victoria

Federal government
Parliament — 6th

Governors
Governor General of the Province of Canada — Edmund Walker Head
Colonial Governor of Newfoundland — Alexander Bannerman
Governor of New Brunswick — Arthur Charles Hamilton-Gordon
Governor of Nova Scotia — George Phipps, 2nd Marquess of Normanby
Governor of Prince Edward Island — Dominick Daly

Premiers
Joint Premiers of the Province of Canada —
George-Étienne Cartier, Canada West Premier
Antoine-Aimé Dorion, Canada East Premier 
Premier of Newfoundland — John Kent
Premier of New Brunswick — Samuel Leonard Tilley
Premier of Nova Scotia — James William Johnston
Premier of Prince Edward Island — Edward Palmer

Events
February 20 – 205 killed when the SS Hungarian (Allan Line) is wrecked at Cape Sable, Nova Scotia
April 26 – The Queen's Own Rifles of Canada formed
May 8 – Roman Catholic Diocese of Chatham (later renamed Roman Catholic Diocese of Bathurst (Canada)) erected
August 25 – Montreal's Victoria Bridge opens
September 1 – In Ottawa, the cornerstone of the Centre Block building is laid by Prince Albert Edward, Prince of Wales, signalling the beginning of the building of the Parliament of Canada buildings.

Full date unknown
Chalon head postage stamp issued in New Brunswick
First ecclesiastical province of the Anglican Church of Canada – Canada – created
Free Methodist Church in Canada founded
Two month tour of Canada by Albert Edward, Prince of Wales

Sport
June 27 – Don Juan won the first Queen's Plate race is held in Toronto.
Fred Lillywhite's The English Cricketers' Trip to Canada and the United States published, detailing the 1859 Tour of the US and Canada

Births

January to June
January 10 – Charles G.D. Roberts, poet and prose writer (died 1943)
March 7 – Alexander Grant MacKay, teacher, lawyer and politician (died 1920)

May 31 – Henry Wise Wood, politician and president of the United Farmers of Alberta (died 1941)
June 1 – Margaret Mick, prison guard, first female Canadian peace officer to be killed in the line of duty (died 1925)
June 5 – John Douglas Hazen, politician and 12th Premier of New Brunswick (died 1937)
June 18 – Laura Muntz Lyall, painter (died 1930)

July to December
July 9 – Frederick Cope, 3rd Mayor of Vancouver (died 1897)
August 14 – Ernest Thompson Seton, author and wildlife artist (died 1946)
August 21 – Aylesworth Perry, 6th Commissioner of the Royal Canadian Mounted Police (died 1956)
August 29 – James Duncan McGregor, agricultural pioneer, politician and Lieutenant-Governor of Manitoba (died 1935)
September 2 – Georgina Fraser Newhall, author and the bardess of the Clan Fraser Society of Canada (died 1932)
September 15 – Napoléon Belcourt, politician (died 1932)
October 14 – John Hampden Burnham, politician and lawyer (died 1940)

Full date unknown
Nazaire-Nicolas Olivier, lawyer and politician (died 1898)

Deaths
January 18 – William Thompson, farmer and political figure (born 1786)
May 26 – John Willson, judge and political figure (born 1776)
July 16 – Brenton Halliburton, army officer, lawyer, judge, and politician (born 1774)
August 10 – Joseph-François Deblois, lawyer, judge and political figure (born 1797)
September 20 – John McDonald, businessman and political figure (born 1787)
October 23 – Peter Boyle de Blaquière, political figure and first chancellor of the University of Toronto (born 1783)

Full date unknown
A-ca-oo-mah-ca-ye, a chief of the Blackfoot First Nation

Historical documents
Escaped slave in Victoria allowed by court to remain, and local paper finds reaction in U.S.A. "blustering," "ridiculous" and "buncombe"

"Pernicious habit" - Letter to the editor (with excerpt from The Lancet) warns against young men and boys smoking

References

 
Canada
Years of the 19th century in Canada
1860 in North America